Jacob's Church (St. Jacob's Evangelical Lutheran Church) is a historic Lutheran church at 213 E. Central Avenue in Miamisburg, Ohio.

It was built in 1864 and added to the National Register in 1990. The builders were Henry & David Groby who were considered "one of the best builders in the area".

External links

 St. Jacob Home Page

References

Lutheran churches in Ohio
Churches on the National Register of Historic Places in Ohio
Gothic Revival church buildings in Ohio
Churches completed in 1864
Churches in Montgomery County, Ohio
National Register of Historic Places in Montgomery County, Ohio
Pennsylvania Dutch culture in Ohio
Miamisburg, Ohio